Zsolt Aubel (born 20 May 1972) is a Hungarian footballer who played for BVSC Budapest as striker.

References
 Futballévkönyv 1999 [Football Yearbook 1999], Volume I, pp. 78–82, Aréna 2000 kiadó, Budapest, 2000; 
 Profile, Nela.hu; Retrieved 16 November 2016.

1972 births
Living people
Hungarian people of German descent
Footballers from Budapest
Hungarian footballers
Hungarian expatriate footballers
Association football forwards
III. Kerületi TUE footballers
Budapesti VSC footballers
Expatriate footballers in Switzerland
FC Monthey players
Hungarian expatriate sportspeople in Switzerland